William Henry Chamberlin (February 17, 1897 – September 12, 1969) was an American historian and journalist. He was the author of several books about the Cold War, communism, and foreign policy, including The Russian Revolution 1917-1921 (1935), which was written in Russia between 1922 and 1934 while he was the Moscow correspondent of The Christian Science Monitor.

He had communist sympathies until he lived in the Soviet Union, when he gradually turned anticommunist. He predicted that intervention in World War II would help communism in Europe and in Asia and so he was a non-interventionist.

Early life and education
Chamberlin was born in Brooklyn and educated in Pennsylvania schools and later at Haverford College. At 25, he moved to Greenwich Village and was deeply affected by the cultural bohemianism and Bolshevik politics there. He worked for Heywood Broun, the book editor of the New York Tribune. He also published under the pseudonym of A.C. Freeman and was a socialist pacifist who supported communism in the Soviet Union.

Soviet sympathizer
Chamberlin arrived in the Soviet Union as a young man and soon found work with the Christian Science Monitor for which he would work until 1940. He also acted as Moscow correspondent for the Manchester Guardian. He was initially a Marxist and a sympathizer with the communist revolution. During his stay, he changed to being a critic. His first book, Soviet Russia, published in 1930, detailed the policies of the New Economic Policy and was on the whole supportive of the changes brought by the Russian Revolution.

However, even then, Chamberlin had his doubts. Toward the end of his stay, he became convinced of the errors of Communist policy. He met his Ukrainian-born wife, Sonya, in the United States, where she and her family had immigrated, visited the Ukraine and the North Caucasus in 1932 and 1933. They witnessed the Holodomor famines, which were produced by forced collectivization.

Turn to anticommunism
After leaving the Soviet Union, Chamberlin went to Germany and his experiences with Nazism further convinced him of the dangers of collectivism and absolutism in general. He became more convinced of the importance of individual rights and of the value of the US Bill of Rights. He was posted by the Monitor to East Asia, and he wrote Japan Over Asia, which was based on what he learned there about Japanese militarism. He was transferred to France.

After returning to the US, Chamberlin lived in Washington, D.C., and then in Cambridge, Massachusetts. Much of his later work was aimed at criticizing communism, socialism, and other forms of collectivism. He continued to write both scholarly books and more popular articles. His The Confessions of an Individualist was an autobiography that was published in 1940, shortly before his collaboration with Russian Review, which was to last until his death from a stroke 28 years later.

Chamberlin believed that the British Empire and the United States should stay out of World War II to prevent communism from spreading in either Europe or Asia since he viewed Germany and Japan as valuable barriers.

Books
 Soviet Russia: A Living Record and a History Little, Brown & Company, 1930.
 Russia's Iron Age (1934).
 The Russian Revolution 1917-1921 (1935).
 Collectivism: A False Utopia (1937).
 The Confessions of an Individualist (1940).
 The World's Iron Age (The Macmillan Company, New York) 1941.
 Canada, Today and Tomorrow (1942).
 The Russian Enigma (1943).
 The Ukraine: A Submerged Nation (The Macmillan Company, New York) 1944.
 America: Partner in World Rule (Vanguard Press, 1945).
 Blueprint for World Conquest, 1946.
 The European Cockpit (The Macmillan Company, New York City) 1947.
 America's Second Crusade. Chicago: Regnery, 1950.
 The Evolution of a Conservative, 1959.
 Appeasement: Road to War. 1962.
 The German Phoenix (1965).
 Beyond Containment. Chicago: Regnery, 1983.
 Japan Over Asia
 Soviet Planned Economic Order
 World Order or Chaos

Notes

Sources
 William Henry Chamberlin Archive at Marxists.org
Mohrenschild, D. von, "William Henry Chamberlin 1897-1969" [obituary] Russian Review, Vol. 29, No. 1 (Jan., 1970), pp. 1–5
Guide to the William Henry Chamberlin papers at Providence College

1897 births
1969 deaths
American political writers
American male non-fiction writers
Historians of Russia
The Christian Science Monitor people
Old Right (United States)
American expatriates in the Soviet Union
Non-interventionism
20th-century American male writers
Member of the Mont Pelerin Society